Jinpyo (fl. 8th century) was a monk in the Korean Silla dynasty.  He was born either in Geumsan or in Samcheok.  His name means "symbol of truth."

According to a story in the Goseungjeon ("Old Monks' Tales"), Jinpyo was a good archer and hunter as a child, and one day he tied a frog's legs with willow-twigs before going into the mountains.  While hunting, he forgot about the frog.  A year later, he heard the sound of something crying, and went back to the same place; there was the frog, still tied up and crying.  At that, the twelve-year-old Jinpyo became a monk and joined the temple of Geumsansa.

Jinpyo is said to have encountered the Maitreya Buddha at Yeongsansa after years of meditation.  Previously, he is said to have encountered other bodhisattvas, including the Manjusri Bodhisattva on the slopes of Odaesan in 740.  After the revelation of the Maitreya, Jinpyo was invited to the Silla court.  He was given abundant funds, which he distributed to Buddhist temples.

See also
 East Asian Yogācāra
 Korean Buddhism
 Geumsansa Temple
 List of Silla people

Silla Buddhist monks